Dženan Haračić (born 30 July 1994) is a Bosnian professional footballer who plays as a centre-forward for Bosnian Premier League club Željezničar.

He previously played for GOŠK Gabela, before joining Željezničar in 2022.

Honours
Individual
First League of FBiH Top Goalscorer: 2020–21 (18 goals), 2021–22 (21 goals)

References

External links
Dženan Haračić at Sofascore

1994 births
Living people
People from Bugojno
Association football forwards
Bosnia and Herzegovina footballers
NK Iskra Bugojno players
NK Slaven Belupo players
NK Koprivnica players
HNK Segesta players
NK Zvijezda Gradačac players
HNK Čapljina players
NK Metalleghe-BSI players
NK Jedinstvo Bihać players
NK GOŠK Gabela players
FK Željezničar Sarajevo players
First League of the Federation of Bosnia and Herzegovina players
Croatian Football League players
Second Football League (Croatia) players
First Football League (Croatia) players
Premier League of Bosnia and Herzegovina players
Bosnia and Herzegovina expatriate footballers
Expatriate footballers in Croatia
Bosnia and Herzegovina expatriate sportspeople in Croatia